Polynucleobacter is a genus of bacteria, originally established by Heckmann and Schmidt (1987) to exclusively harbor obligate endosymbionts of ciliates belonging to the genus Euplotes.

Recently, several new Polynucleobacter species were described, which all represent free-living (i.e. not host-associated) planktonic freshwater bacteria. Thus, the genus Polynucleobacter currently includes one species containing obligate endosymbionts of ciliates and nine species representing free-living planktonic strains. The type strains of the planktonic species were isolated from freshwater systems located in Antarctica, Armenia, Austria, China, Czech Republic, Finland, France, Germany, Norway, Spain, Uganda, and the United States. Currently, the genus harbors 31 species.

Free-living Poynucleobacter bacteria represent important members of bacterioplankton in freshwater systems such as lakes, ponds, and streams.

Genomics
Two genome projects are finished on P. necessarius strains: one project on an obligately freeliving strain isolated from an acidic freshwater pond, and one project on an obligate endosymbiont of the ciliate Euplotes aediculatus.

Analyses of the genome sequences resulted in the discovery of a conserved RNA motif.

References

External links
 Genus: Polynucleobacter - LPSN, List of Prokaryotic names with Standing in Nomenclature
 Polynucleobacter – NCBI Taxonomy Browser

Burkholderiaceae
Bacteria genera